Acacia uncinata, commonly known as gold-dust wattle or round-leaved wattle, is a shrub belonging to the genus Acacia and the subgenus Phyllodineae that is native to parts of eastern Australia.

Description
The dull grey-green phyllodes are flat or slightly twisted with an elliptic to broadly elliptic shape that can sometimes be broadly obovate. The spherical flower heads contain 14 to 23 pale yellow flowers.

Taxonomy
The species was first formally described by the botanist John Lindley in 1830 as part of the work Edwards's Botanical Register. It was reclassified as Racosperma uncinatum in 1987 by Leslie Pedley then transferred back to the genus Acacia in 2006.
The specific epithet is reference to the phyllode's curved point. A. uncinata strongly resembles Acacia aureocrinita. Other synonyms include; Acacia oleifolia, Acacia dysophylla, Acacia undulifolia var. dysophylla and Acacia undulifolia.

Distribution
It is found in the north eastern part of Mount Kaputar National Park in New South Wales where it grows along watercourses and on hillsides Eucalyptus and Callitris woodland communities in rocky sandy-loam soils.

See also
 List of Acacia species

References

uncinata
Flora of New South Wales
Plants described in 1830